Dale Street is a thoroughfare in Liverpool, England, in the Commercial Centre conservation area. The street together with Castle Street, Old Hall Street, Victoria Street and Water Street are the main commercial streets and occupy an area of the medieval town of Liverpool. It contains many Grade II listed buildings.

Alois Hitler Jr, the half brother of Adolf Hitler, ran a restaurant there. Bridget Hitler, the wife of Alois, maintained that Adolf lived with them in Liverpool from 1912 to 1913 while he was on the run for dodging the draft in his native Austria-Hungary.

Grade II Listed buildings

 Liverpool, London and Globe Building
 Union Marine Buildings
 Saddle Inn
 Rigby's Buildings
 Guardian Assurance Buildings
 Nos. 51 to 55 ( odd )
 Magistrates' Courts
 Nos. 135 to 139 ( odd )
 Queen's Buildings
 State Insurance Building
 The Temple
 Prudential Assurance Building
 Buckley's Building
 Muskar's Buildings
 Imperial Chambers
 Municipal Annexe
 Municipal Buildings
 Nos. 86 to 98

References

Streets in Liverpool